Ghost Hunting is a 2017 Palestinian documentary film directed by Raed Andoni and starring Ramzi Maqdisi. It was awarded the best documentary at the Berlinale 2017. Also, it was selected as the Palestinian entry for the Best Foreign Language Film at the 91st Academy Awards, but it was not nominated.

Synopsis
Released Palestinian prisoners of Israel relive and recreate harrowing experiences from their time in Israeli detention facilities.

See also
 List of submissions to the 91st Academy Awards for Best Foreign Language Film
 List of Palestinian submissions for the Academy Award for Best Foreign Language Film

References

External links
 

2017 films
2017 documentary films
Palestinian documentary films
2010s Arabic-language films